The Argonauts were a band of heroes in Greek mythology, who in the years before the Trojan War (around 1300 BC) accompanied Jason to Colchis in his quest to find the Golden Fleece. Their name comes from their ship, Argo, named after its builder, Argus. They were sometimes called Minyans, after a prehistoric tribe in the area.

Mythology

The Golden Fleece

After the death of King Cretheus, the Aeolian Pelias usurped the throne from his half-brother Aeson and became king of Iolcus in Thessaly (near the modern city of Volos). Because of this unlawful act, an oracle warned him that a descendant of Aeolus would seek revenge. Pelias put to death every prominent descendant of Aeolus he could, but spared Aeson because of the pleas of their mother Tyro. Instead, Pelias kept Aeson prisoner and forced him to renounce his inheritance. Aeson married Alcimede, who bore him a son named Jason. Pelias intended to kill the baby at once, but Alcimede summoned her kinswomen to weep over him as if he were stillborn. She faked a burial and smuggled the baby to Mount Pelion. He was raised by the centaur Chiron, the trainer of heroes.

When Jason was 20 years old, an oracle ordered him to dress as a Magnesian and head to the Iolcan court. While traveling Jason lost his sandal crossing the muddy Anavros river while helping an old woman (Hera in disguise). The goddess was angry with King Pelias for killing his stepgrandmother Sidero after she had sought refuge in Hera's temple.

Another oracle warned Pelias to be on his guard against a man with one shoe. Pelias was presiding over a sacrifice to Poseidon with several neighboring kings in attendance. Among the crowd stood a tall youth in leopard skin with only one sandal. Pelias recognized that Jason was his nephew. He could not kill him because prominent kings of the Aeolian family were present. Instead, he asked Jason: "What would you do if an oracle announced that one of your fellow-citizens were destined to kill you?" Jason replied that he would send him to go and fetch the Golden Fleece, not knowing that Hera had put those words in his mouth.

Jason learned later that Pelias was being haunted by the ghost of Phrixus. Phrixus had fled from Orchomenus riding on a divine ram to avoid being sacrificed and took refuge in Colchis where he was later denied proper burial. According to an oracle, Iolcus would never prosper unless his ghost was taken back in a ship, together with the golden ram's fleece. This fleece now hung from a tree in the grove of the Colchian Ares, guarded night and day by a dragon that never slept. Pelias swore before Zeus that he would give up the throne at Jason's return while expecting that Jason's attempt to steal the Golden Fleece would be a fatal enterprise. However, Hera acted in Jason's favour during the perilous journey.

The crew of Argo
There is no definite list of the Argonauts. H. J. Rose explains this was because "an Argonautic ancestor was an addition to even the proudest of pedigrees." The following list is collated from several lists given in ancient sources.

In Pindar's Pythian Odes, the following heroes are either named or implied as part of the Argonauts: Jason, Heracles, Castor, Polydeuces, Euphemus, Periclymenus, Echion, Erytus, Orpheus, Zetes, Calais and Mopsus.

Several more names are discoverable from other sources:
Amyrus, eponym of a Thessalian city, is given by Stephanus of Byzantium as "one of the Argonauts"; he is otherwise said to have been a son of Poseidon and to have given his name to the river Amyrus.
Philammon, son of Apollo was also reported one of the Argonauts.

The journey
Jason, along with his other 49 crew-mates, sailed off from Iolcus to Colchis to fetch the golden fleece.

Women of Lemnos 
The Argonauts first stopped at Lemnos where they learned that all the males had been murdered. The reason of which was as follows: for several years, the women did not honor and make offerings to Aphrodite and because of her anger, she visited them with a noisome smell. Therefore, their spouses took captive women from the neighboring country of Thrace and bedded with them. Dishonored, all the Lemnian women, except Hypsipyle, were instigated by the same goddess in conspiring to kill their fathers and husbands. They then deposed King Thoas, who should have died along with the whole tribe of men, but was secretly spared by his daughter Hypsipyle. She put Thoas on board a ship which a storm carried to the island of Taurica.

In the meantime, the Argonauts sailing along, the guardian of the harbour Iphinoe saw them and announced their coming to Hypsipyle, the new queen. Polyxo who by virtue of her middle age, gave advice that she should put them under obligation to the gods of hospitality and invite them to a friendly reception. Hypsipyle fell in love with their captain Jason and bedded with him. She bore him sons, Euneus and Nebrophonus or Deipylus. The other Argonauts consorted with the Lemnian women, and their descendants were called Minyans, since some among them had previously emigrated from Minyan Orchomenus to Iolcus. (Later, these Minyans were driven out from the island and came to Lacedaemon). The Lemnian women gave the names of the Argonauts to the children they had conceived by them. Delayed many days there, they were chided by Hercules and departed.

But later, when the other women learned that Hypsipyle had spared her father, they tried to kill her. She fled from them, but pirates captured and took her to Thebes where they sold her as a slave to King Lycus. (Hypsipyle reappeared years later, when the Argives marching against Thebes learned from her the way to a spring in Nemea, where she served as nurse to King Lycurgus' son Opheltes.) Her son Euneus, later became king of Lemnos. In order to purify the island from blood guilt, he ordered that all Lemnian hearth-fires be put off for nine days and a new fire be brought on a ship from Apollo's altar in Delos.

Island of Cyzicus 
After Lemnos, the Argonauts made their second stop at Bear Mountain, an island of the Propontis shaped like a bear. The locals, called the Doliones, were all descended from Poseidon. Their king Cyzicus, son of Eusorus, who had just got married received the Argonauts with generous hospitality and decided to have a huge party with them. During that event, the king tried to tell Jason not to go to the eastern side of the island, but he got distracted by Heracles, and forgot to tell Jason.

When they had left the king and sailed a whole day, a storm that arose in the night brought them unaware to the same island. Cyzicus, thinking they were Pelasgican army (for they were constantly harassed by these enemies) attacked them on the shore at night in mutual ignorance of each other. The Argonauts slew many and among the rest Cyzicus who was killed by Jason himself. On the next day, when they came near the shore and knew what they had done, the Argonauts mourned and cut off their hair. Meanwhile, Jason gave Cyzicus a costly burial and handed over the kingdom to his sons.

Lost comrades 
After the burial, the Argonauts sailed away and touched at Mysia, where they left behind Heracles and Polyphemus. Hylas, son of Thiodamas, had been sent to draw water and was ravished away by nymphs on account of his beauty. However, Polyphemus heard him cry out and gave chase, believing that he was being carried off by robbers. After informing Heracles, the ship put to sea while the two searched for Hylas. Polyphemus ended up founding the city Cius in Mysia, reigning as king while Heracles returned to Argos, though accounts differ regarding Heracles' story. Herodorus' version says that Heracles did not sail at all at that time, but was instead serving as a slave at the court of Omphale. Pherecydes' version says that he was left behind at Aphetae in Thessaly, the Argo having declared with human voice that she could not bear his weight. Nevertheless, Demaratus recorded that Heracles sailed to Colchis; for Dionysius even affirmed that he was the leader of the Argonauts.

Land of the Bebrycians 
From Mysia, they departed to the land of the Bebryces which was ruled by King Amycus, son of Poseidon and Melie, a Bithynian nymph. Being a doughty man, he compelled the strangers who came to his kingdom to contend with him in boxing and slew the vanquished. When he challenged the best man of the crew to a boxing match, Pollux fought against him and slew him with a blow on the elbow. When the Bebryces made a rush at him, the chiefs snatched up their arms and put them to flight with great slaughter.

Phineus and the Harpies 
Thence, they put to sea and came to land at Salmydessus in Thrace, where Phineus dwelt. The latter was said to be the son of Agenor or of Poseidon, and a seer who was bestowed by Apollo with the gift of prophecy. Phineus had lost the sight of both eyes because of the following reasons, (1) blinded by Zeus because he revealed the deliberations of the gods and foretold the future to men, (2) by Boreas and the Argonauts because he blinded his own two sons by Cleopatra at the instigation of their stepmother; or (3) by Poseidon, because he revealed to the children of Phrixus how they could sail from Colchis to Greece. Zeus then set over him the Harpies, who are called the hounds of Zeus. These were winged female creatures, and when a table was laid for Phineus, they flew down from the sky and snatched up most of the victuals from his lips, and what little they left stank so that nobody could touch it.

When the Argonauts would have consulted him about the voyage, he said that he would advise them about it if they would free him from the punishment. So the Argonauts laid a table of viands beside him, and the Harpies with a shriek suddenly pounced down and snatched away the food. When Zetes and Calais, the sons of Boreas, saw that, they drew their swords and, having wings on head and feet, pursued them through the air. Now it was fated that the Harpies should perish by the sons of Boreas, and that the sons of Boreas should die when they could not catch up a fugitive. So the Harpies were pursued and one of them fell into the river Tigres in Peloponnese, the river that is now called Harpys after her; some call her Nicothoe, but others Aellopus. But the other, named Ocypete or, according to others, Ocythoe (but Hesiod calls her Ocypode) fled by the Propontis till she came to the Echinadian Islands, which are now called Strophades after her; for when she came to them she turned (estraphe) and being at the shore fell for very weariness with her pursuer. But Apollonius in the Argonautica says that the Harpies were pursued to the Strophades Islands and suffered no harm, having sworn an oath that they would wrong Phineus no more. Eventually, the Argonauts freed Phineus from the punishment.

The clashing rocks 
Being rid of the Harpies, Phineus revealed to the Argonauts the course of their voyage, and advised them about the Clashing Rocks in the sea. These were huge cliffs, which, dashed together by the force of the winds, closed the sea passage. Thick was the mist that swept over them, and loud the crash, and it was impossible for even the birds to pass between them. So he told them to let fly a dove between the rocks, and, if they saw it pass safe through, to thread the narrows with an easy mind, but if they saw it perish, then not to force a passage. When they heard that, they put to sea, and on nearing the rocks let fly a dove from the prow, and as she flew the clash of the rocks nipped off the tip of her tail. So, waiting till the rocks had recoiled, with hard rowing and the help of Hera, they passed through, the extremity of the ship's ornamented poop being shorn away right round. Henceforth the Clashing Rocks stood still; for it was fated that, so soon as a ship had made the passage, they should come to rest completely.

Lycus 
When the Argonauts entered the sea called Euxine through the Cyanean Cliffs (i.e. Clashing Rocks of the Symplegades), they arrived among the Mariandynians. There King Lycus received them kindly grateful because they had killed Amycus, who had often attacked him. While the Argonauts were staying with Lycus and went out to gather straw, the seer Idmon, son of Apollo, was wounded by a wild boar and died. Also, on that island Tiphys died, and Ancaeus undertook to steer the ship.

Island of Dia 
By the will of Hera they were borne to the island of Dia. There the Stymphalian Birds were wounding them, using their feathers as arrows, they were not able to cope with the great numbers of birds. Following Phineus' advice they seized shields and spears, and dispersed them by the noise, after the manner of the Curetes.

The Argonauts also found shipwrecked men in the island, naked and helpless—the sons of Phrixus and Chalciope—Argus, Phrontides, Melas, and Cylindrus. These told their misfortunes to Jason, how they had suffered shipwreck and been cast there when they were hastening to go to their grandfather Athamas, and Jason welcomed and aided them. And having sailed past the Thermodon and the Caucasus, they came to the river Phasis, which is in the Colchian land. The sons of Phrixus led Jason to land and bade the Argonauts to conceal the ship. They themselves went to their mother Chalciope, Medea's sister, and made known the kindness of Jason, and why they had come. Then Chalciope told about Medea, and brought her with her sons to Jason. When she saw him, she recognized him as the one whom in dreams she had loved deeply by Hera's urging, and promised him everything. They brought him to the temple.

Aeetes 
An oracle told Aeetes, son of Helios, that he would keep his kingdom as long as the fleece which Phrixus had dedicated remained at the shrine of Ares. When the ship was brought into port, Jason repaired to Aeetes, and setting forth the charge laid on him by Pelias invited him to give him the fleece. The other promised to give it if single-handed he yoked with adamant the brazen-footed bulls. These were two wild bulls of enormous size that he had got as a gift of Hephaestus; they had brazen feet and puffed flames from their mouths and nostrils. These creatures Aeetes ordered him to yoke and plow, and to sow from a helmet the dragon's teeth; for he had got from Athena half of the dragon's teeth which Cadmus sowed in Thebes. These tribe of armed men should arise and slay each other. While Jason puzzled how he could yoke the bulls, Hera wished to save him because once when she had come to a river and wished to test the minds of men, she assumed an old woman's form, and asked to be carried across. He had carried her across when others who had passed over despised her. And so, since she knew that Jason could not perform the commands without help of Medea, she asked Aphrodite to inspire Medea, daughter of Aeetes and the Oceanid Idyia, with love.

At Aphrodite's instigation, the witch conceived a passion for the man. Fearing that Jason might be destroyed by the bulls, she, keeping the thing from her father, promised to help him yoke the bulls and deliver the fleece to him. Medea also asked the hero to swear to have her become his wife and take her with him on the voyage to Greece. When Jason swore to do so, she aided him to be freed from all danger, for she gave him a drug with which she bade him anoint his shield, spear, and body when he was about to yoke the bulls; for she said that, anointed with it, for a single day he could be harmed neither by fire nor by iron. She signified to him that when the teeth were sown, armed men would spring up from the ground against him; and when he saw a knot of them he was to throw stones into their midst from a distance. When the men fought each other about that, he was taken to kill them. On hearing that, Jason anointed himself with the drug. He arrived to the grove of the temple and sought the bulls. And, even though they charged him with a flame of fire, he managed to yoke them. Then, when he had sown the teeth, armed men rose from the ground; and where he saw several together, he pelted them unseen with stones, and when they fought each other, he drew near and slew them. However, though the bulls were yoked, Aeetes did not give Jason the fleece for he wished to burn down the Argo and kill the crew. But before he could do so, Medea brought Jason by night to the shrine. Having lulled the dragon that guarded it to sleep with her drugs, she possessed herself of the fleece. In Jason's company, she came to the Argo, and the Argonauts put to sea by night to set off to their country.

Absyrtus 
Medea was attended by her brother Apsyrtus when they escaped from Colchis. When he discovered the daring deeds done by Medea, he started off in pursuit of the ship. Medea noticed her brother's ship and murdered him. Then, she cut his body limb from limb and threw the pieces into the deep. Gathering his child's limbs, Aeetes fell behind in the pursuit; wherefore he turned back, and, having buried the rescued limbs of his child, he called the place Tomi. He sent out many of the Colchians to search for the Argo, threatening that if they did not bring Medea to him, they should suffer the punishment due to her; so they separated and pursued the search in diverse places. When the Argonauts were already sailing past the Eridanus river, Zeus, in his anger at the murder of Apsyrtus, sent a furious storm upon them which drove them out of their course. And, as they were sailing past the Apsyrtides Islands, the ship spoke, saying that the wrath of Zeus would not cease unless they journeyed to Ausonia and were purified by Circe for the murder of Apsyrtus. So when they had sailed past the Ligurian and Celtic nations and had voyaged through the Sardinian Sea, they skirted Tyrrhenia and came to Aeaea, where they supplicated Circe and were purified.

Sirens 
As the Argonauts sailed past the Sirens, Orpheus restrained them by chanting a counter-melody. Butes alone swam off to the Sirens, but Aphrodite carried him away and settled him in Lilybaion. After the Sirens, the ship encountered Charybdis and Scylla and the Wandering Rocks, above which a great flame and smoke were seen rising. Thetis with the Nereids steered the ship safely through them at the summons of Hera.

Phaeacians 
Having passed by the Island of Thrinacia, where are the kine of the Sun, they came to Corcyra, the island of the Phaeacians, of which Alcinous was king. But when the Colchians could not find the ship, some of them settled at the Ceraunian mountains, and some journeyed to Illyria and colonized the Apsyrtides Islands. But some came to the Phaeacians, and finding the Argo there, they demanded of Alcinous that he should give up Medea. He answered, that if she already knew Jason, he would give her to him, but that if she were still a maid he would send her away to her father. However, Arete, wife of Alcinous, anticipated matters by marrying Medea to Jason.

In some accounts, however, Absyrtus with armed guards was sent in pursuit of the Argo by his father Aeetes. When the latter had caught up with her in the Adriatic Sea in Histria at King Alcinous' court, and would fight for her, Alcinous intervened to prevent their fighting. They took him as arbiter, and he put them off till the next day. When he seemed depressed and Arete, his wife, asked him the cause of his sadness, he said he had been made arbiter by two different states, to judge between Colchians and Argives. When Arete asked him what judgment he would give, Alcinous replied that if Medea were a virgin, he would give her to her father, but if not, to her husband. When Arete heard this from her husband, she sent word to Jason, and he lay with Medea by night in a cave. Then next day when they came to court, and Medea was found to be a wife she was given to her husband. Nevertheless, when they had left, Absyrtus, fearing his father's commands, pursued them to the island of Athena. When Jason was sacrificing there to Athena, and Absyrtus came upon him, he was killed by Jason. Medea gave him burial, and they departed. The Colchians who had come with Absyrtus, fearing Aeetes, settled down among the Phaeacians and founded a town which from Absyrtus' name they called Absoros. Now this island is located in Histria, opposite Pola.

Sailing by night, the Argonauts encountered a violent storm, and Apollo, taking his stand on the Melantian ridges, flashed lightning down, shooting a shaft into the sea. Then they perceived an island close at hand, and anchoring there they named it Anaphe, because it had loomed up (anaphanenai) unexpectedly. So they founded an altar of Radiant Apollo, and having offered sacrifice they betook them to feasting; and twelve handmaids, whom Arete had given to Medea, jested merrily with the chiefs; whence it is still customary for the women to jest at the sacrifice.

Talos 
Putting to sea from there, they were hindered from touching at Crete by Talos. Some say that he was a man of the Brazen Race, others that he was given to Minos by Hephaestus; he was a brazen man, but some say that he was a bull. He had a single vein extending from his neck to his ankles, and a bronze nail was rammed home at the end of the vein. This Talos kept guard, running round the island thrice every day; wherefore, when he saw the Argo standing inshore, he pelted it as usual with stones. His death was brought about by the wiles of Medea, whether, as some say, she drove him mad by drugs, or, as others say, she promised to make him immortal and then drew out the nail, so that all the ichor gushed out and he died. But some say that Poeas shot him dead in the ankle.

Homecoming 
After tarrying a single night there, they put in to Aigina to draw water, and a contest arose among them concerning the drawing of the water. Thence they sailed betwixt Euboea and Locris and came to Iolcus, having completed the whole voyage in four months.

Alternative stories for the returned route 
Sozomen wrote that when the Argonauts left from the Aeetes, they returned from a different route, crossed the sea of Scythia, sailed through some of the rivers there, and when they were near the shores of Italy, they built a city in order to stay at the winter, which they called Emona, part of modern-day Ljubljana in Slovenia. At summer, with the assistance of the locals, they dragged the Argo to the Aquilis river, which falls into the Eridanus. The Eridanus itself falls into the Adriatic sea.

Zosimus wrote that after they left from the Aeetes, they arrived at the mouth of the Ister river which it discharges itself into the Black Sea and they went up that river against the stream, by the help of oars and convenient gales of wind. After they managed to do it, they built the city of Emona as a memorial of their arrival there. Afterwards placing the Argo, on machines they drew it as far as the sea-side and from there they went at the Thessalian shore.

Pliny the Elder wrote that some writers claim that the Argo came down some river into the Adriatic sea, not far from Tergeste but that river is now unknown. While other writers say that the ship was carried across the Alps on men's shoulders, having passed along the Ister river, then along the Savus river, and then to Nauportus which is lying between the Emona and the Alps.

See also
 Argo Navis
 Argonaut Mine
 Jason for more details on the quest for the Golden Fleece
 Toronto Argonauts, a Canadian Football League team
 Argonaut Rowing Club, a rowing club based out of Toronto
 University of West Florida; the mascot of the University

Notes

References 
 Apollodorus, The Library with an English Translation by Sir James George Frazer, F.B.A., F.R.S. in 2 Volumes, Cambridge, MA, Harvard University Press; London, William Heinemann Ltd. 1921. . Online version at the Perseus Digital Library. Greek text available from the same website.
Apollonius Rhodius, Argonautica translated by Robert Cooper Seaton (1853–1915), R. C. Loeb Classical Library Volume 001. London, William Heinemann Ltd, 1912. Online version at the Topos Text Project.
Apollonius Rhodius, Argonautica. George W. Mooney. London. Longmans, Green. 1912. Greek text available at the Perseus Digital Library.
Diodorus Siculus, The Library of History translated by Charles Henry Oldfather. Twelve volumes. Loeb Classical Library. Cambridge, Massachusetts: Harvard University Press; London: William Heinemann, Ltd. 1989. Vol. 3. Books 4.59–58. Online version at Bill Thayer's Web Site
Diodorus Siculus, Bibliotheca Historica. Vol 1–2. Immanel Bekker. Ludwig Dindorf. Friedrich Vogel. in aedibus B. G. Teubneri. Leipzig. 1888–1890. Greek text available at the Perseus Digital Library.
Euripides, The Plays of Euripides, translated by E. P. Coleridge. Volume II. London. George Bell and Sons. 1891. Online version at the Perseus Digital Library.
Euripides, Euripidis Fabulae. vol. 3. Gilbert Murray. Oxford. Clarendon Press, Oxford. 1913. Greek text available at the Perseus Digital Library.
Gaius Julius Hyginus, Fabulae from The Myths of Hyginus translated and edited by Mary Grant. University of Kansas Publications in Humanistic Studies. Online version at the Topos Text Project.
Gaius Valerius Flaccus, Argonautica translated by Mozley, J H. Loeb Classical Library Volume 286. Cambridge, MA, Harvard University Press; London, William Heinemann Ltd. 1928. Online version at theio.com.
Gaius Valerius Flaccus, Argonauticon. Otto Kramer. Leipzig. Teubner. 1913. Latin text available at the Perseus Digital Library.
Graves, Robert, The Greek Myths: The Complete and Definitive Edition. Penguin Books Limited. 2017. 
Ken Inglis, This is the ABC: The Australian Broadcasting Commission 1932–1983, 2006
Pausanias, Description of Greece with an English Translation by W.H.S. Jones, Litt.D., and H.A. Ormerod, M.A., in 4 Volumes. Cambridge, MA, Harvard University Press; London, William Heinemann Ltd. 1918. . Online version at the Perseus Digital Library
Pausanias, Graeciae Descriptio. 3 vols. Leipzig, Teubner. 1903.  Greek text available at the Perseus Digital Library.
Pliny the Elder, The Natural History. John Bostock, M.D., F.R.S. H.T. Riley, Esq., B.A. London. Taylor and Francis, Red Lion Court, Fleet Street. 1855. Online version at the Perseus Digital Library.
Pliny the Elder, Naturalis Historia. Karl Friedrich Theodor Mayhoff. Lipsiae. Teubner. 1906. Latin text available at the Perseus Digital Library.
Sextus Propertius, Elegies from Charm. Vincent Katz. trans. Los Angeles. Sun & Moon Press. 1995. Online version at the Perseus Digital Library. Latin text available at the same website.
Stephanus of Byzantium, Stephani Byzantii Ethnicorum quae supersunt, edited by August Meineike (1790–1870), published 1849. A few entries from this important ancient handbook of place names have been translated by Brady Kiesling. Online version at the Topos Text Project.
Strabo, The Geography of Strabo. Edition by H.L. Jones. Cambridge, Mass.: Harvard University Press; London: William Heinemann, Ltd. 1924. Online version at the Perseus Digital Library.
Strabo, Geographica edited by A. Meineke. Leipzig: Teubner. 1877. Greek text available at the Perseus Digital Library.
Tzetzes, John, Allegories of the Iliad translated by Goldwyn, Adam J. and Kokkini, Dimitra. Dumbarton Oaks Medieval Library, Harvard University Press, 2015.

Further reading
 J.R. Bacon, The Voyage of the Argonauts. (London: Methuen, 1925).
 
 Dimitris Michalopoulos and Antonis Milanos, The Evolution of the Hellenic Mercantile Marine through the Ages, The Piraeus: Institute of Hellenic Maritime History, 2014

External links

 Definition of an "argonaut" and the history of how this myth has become embedded in Western culture.
 Jason and the Argonauts, extensive site by Jason Colavito

 
Characters in the Argonautica
Deeds of Zeus
Deeds of Hera
Iolcus